Cimmino is a surname. Notable people with the surname include:

 Catello Cimmino (born 1965), Italian footballer
 Gianfranco Cimmino (1908–1989), Italian mathematician

See also
 Cimino (surname)

Italian-language surnames